Sky Box Sets is a television channel owned and operated by New Zealand's Sky. It was launched on 1 August 2017 on Sky Channel 9 in 1080i high-definition. The channel screens an entire season of a television series at 7:30pm every night.

The channel screens drama and comedy series such as Bellevue, American Gothic, Mary Kills People, Jane the Virgin, Fortitude, 11.22.63 and Outcast.

External links

Television channels in New Zealand
Television channels and stations established in 2017
English-language television stations in New Zealand
2013 establishments in New Zealand